Trevor Lewis (born January 8, 1987) is an American professional ice hockey centre who currently plays for the Calgary Flames of the National Hockey League (NHL). Lewis appeared in parts of 12 seasons with the Los Angeles Kings after being drafted 16th overall by the team in the 2006 NHL Entry Draft; he spent one season with the Winnipeg Jets before signing with Calgary in 2021. He won Stanley Cup championships with the Kings in 2012 and 2014.

Early life
The son of a transplanted Canadian, Lewis grew up in Salt Lake City where he learned to skate at the age of two. He began playing hockey at the age of five, eventually moving to Colorado Springs, Colorado at the age of 14 to play for the Pike's Peak Miners AAA team. https://www.nhl.com/kings/news/johnny-utah-trevor-lewis-story/c-768077

Playing career
Lewis was drafted 17th overall by the Los Angeles Kings in the 2006 NHL Entry Draft, following an award-winning season in the United States Hockey League with the Des Moines Buccaneers. On July 14, 2006, the Kings signed Lewis to a three-year entry level contract. He played the 2006–07 season with the Owen Sound Attack of the Ontario Hockey League (OHL) before making his professional debut with the Kings' top affiliate team, the Manchester Monarchs, to end the season. Lewis made his NHL debut on December 19, 2008, vs. the Buffalo Sabres. He scored his first NHL goal on December 20, 2008.

On July 15, 2011, Lewis signed a two-year extension with the Kings worth $1.45 million.

In the 2011–12 season, on June 11, 2012, Lewis won the Stanley Cup as a member of the Los Angeles Kings, their first championship in franchise history. He scored two goals in the clinching game six. Lewis signed another two-year extension with the Kings on April 8, 2014, before helping the Kings to their second Stanley Cup.

He signed a four-year contract with the Kings on June 25, 2016. It would pay off, as in the 2016–17 season, Lewis would score an equal 12 goals and assists for 24 points, playing a full 82 games for the first time in his career.

During the following 2017–18 season, Lewis put up a career-high 26 points despite being placed on injured reserve in February. After appearing in 17 games for the Kings during the 2018–19 season, and recording three points, Lewis was again placed on injured reserve due to a lower-body injury. He was activated off injured reserve on February 9, 2019, after missing 37 games.

As a free agent and leaving the Kings organization after 12 seasons, Lewis remained un-signed leading into the pandemic-delayed 2020–21 season. He accepted an invitation to join the Winnipeg Jets training camp on a professional tryout basis and upon impressing was later signed to a one-year, $750,000 contract with the Jets on January 13, 2021. Later, on February 2, 2021, Lewis scored his first goal as a Winnipeg Jet- a shorthanded goal- in a 3-2 Jets win vs the visiting Calgary Flames.

On July 28, 2021, Lewis signed a one-year, $800,000 contract as a free agent with the Calgary Flames, reuniting him with former Kings head coach Darryl Sutter. Lewis earned his first point with the Flames, an assist in a game against the New York Rangers.

Personal life
Lewis is married to Kara, and they have two children, both twins. They would welcome another child into the family in April 2022.

Career statistics

Regular season and playoffs

International

Awards and honors

References

External links

1987 births
Living people
American men's ice hockey centers
Calgary Flames players
Des Moines Buccaneers players
Ice hockey people from Utah
Los Angeles Kings draft picks
Los Angeles Kings players
Manchester Monarchs (AHL) players
National Hockey League first-round draft picks
Owen Sound Attack players
Sportspeople from Salt Lake City
Stanley Cup champions
Utah Grizzlies (ECHL) players
Winnipeg Jets players